Peter Brown is an American writer and illustrator who is best known for children's picture books. He won a Caldecott Honor in 2013 for his illustration of Creepy Carrots!.

Biography 
Brown was raised in Hopewell, New Jersey and studied illustration at Art Center College of Design. After graduating from, he moved to New York City in 2002 to be closer to the publishing industry. He was working on animated TV shows when he signed a book deal to write and illustrate his first picture book, Flight of the Dodo. 

Peter quickly signed up his second and third books, and his career as an author and illustrator of children’s books was under way. Since then Peter has written and illustrated many books for children and earned numerous honors, including a Caldecott Honor, a Horn Book Award, two E.B. White Awards, two E.B. White Honors, a Children’s Choice Award for Illustrator of the Year, two Irma Black Honors, a Golden Kite Award, a New York Times Best Illustrated Book Award and multiple New York Times bestsellers that include the novels The Wild Robot and The Wild Robot Escapes.

Works

As writer and illustrator
Flight of the Dodo (2005)
Chowder (2006)
The Fabulous Bouncing Chowder (2007)
The Curious Garden (2009)
Children Make Terrible Pets (2010)
YOU WILL BE MY FRIEND! (2011)
Mr. Tiger Goes Wild (2013)
My Teacher is a Monster! (No, I Am Not.) (2014)
The Wild Robot (2016)
The Wild Robot Escapes (2017)
Fred Gets Dressed (2021)

As illustrator
Barkbelly (2006) by Cat Weatherill
Snowbone (2007) by Cat Weatherill
Kaline Klattermaster’s Tree House (2008) by Haven Kimmel
The Purple Kangaroo (2009) by Michael Ian Black
Creepy Carrots! (2012) by Aaron Reynolds
Creepy Pair of Underwear! (2017) by Aaron Reynolds
Creepy Crayon! (2022) by Aaron Reynolds

References

External links

American children's book illustrators
American children's writers
Living people
Year of birth missing (living people)
Caldecott Honor winners